Gajansar River is a river in western India in Gujarat whose origin is near the village of Vigodi. Its drainage basin has a maximum length of 37 km. The total catchment area of the basin is 159 km2.

References 

Rivers of Gujarat
Rivers of India